Mian Rudan (also Romanized as Mīān Rūdān and Miyan Roodan; also known as Mīānrūd) is a village in Galehzan Rural District, in the Central District of Khomeyn County, Markazi Province, Iran. At the 2006 census, its population was 61, in 20 families.

References 

Populated places in Khomeyn County